The John Thomas Dye School, nicknamed JTD, is an independent private coeducational nonsectarian elementary day school located in the Bel-Air area of Los Angeles, California, serving students in kindergarten through sixth grade.

The school was founded in 1929 as the Brentwood Town and Country School by Cathryn Roberts Dye and her husband John Thomas Dye II with its first classes held in the Dyes' living room, and their son John Thomas Dye III its first student. The first permanent facility was built in 1949 and named the Bel Air Town and Country School, on the site still occupied by the school today. The school building was designed by noted Santa Monica architect John Byers.
In 1959, the School was renamed The John Thomas Dye School in honor of John Thomas Dye III, who, while serving as a fighter pilot, was killed by enemy action in World War II.

Notable alumni
 Paul Thomas Anderson
 Eric Avery
 Jane Fonda
 Peter Hudnut
 Erik Laykin
 Michael Madden
 Lisa Marie Presley
 Maureen Reagan
 Ron Reagan
 Melissa Rivers
 Rod Roddenberry
 Tori Spelling
 Monica Lewinsky
 Kimberly Ovitz
 Brad Wyman
 Wes Parker
 Jonathan Martin
 Bruce Johnston (The Beach Boys )
Olivia Jade Giannulli

References

External links

National Center for Education Statistics data for John Thomas Dye School

Private elementary schools in California
Educational institutions established in 1929
Schools in Los Angeles
Bel Air, Los Angeles
1929 establishments in California